Concrete and Gold is the ninth studio album by American rock band Foo Fighters, released on September 15, 2017, through Roswell and RCA Records. It is the band's first album to be produced alongside Greg Kurstin. Described by the band as an album where "hard rock extremes and pop sensibilities collide", Concrete and Gold concerns the future of the United States from the viewpoint of the band's frontman and lead songwriter Dave Grohl, with the heated atmosphere of the 2016 elections and the presidency of Donald Trump cited as major influences by Grohl. Juxtapositions serve as a common motif in both the album's lyrical and musical composition, with Grohl further describing the album's overall theme as "hope and desperation".

Writing and recording of Concrete and Gold started in late 2016, after Grohl ended a self-imposed six-month hiatus from music while recovering from an injury sustained on the Sonic Highways World Tour. Working off a set of twelve or thirteen ideas for songs conceived by Grohl, the band enlisted the help of Kurstin, a pop music producer, who had never worked on a heavy rock record previously. The studio at which the band chose to record Concrete and Gold, EastWest Studios in Hollywood, California, fostered collaborations with various other artists who were also working at the studio at the time, including Shawn Stockman of Boyz II Men, Justin Timberlake, and Paul McCartney. It is the first Foo Fighters studio album to feature long-time session and touring keyboardist Rami Jaffee as a permanent member.

Concrete and Gold was received positively by music critics, who praised the album's more expansive feel, both musically and lyrically. Modest criticism was aimed at the perceived lack of musical deviation from the band's previous albums. The album became the band's second to debut at number one on the Billboard 200, moving 127,000 album-equivalent units and selling 120,000 copies in its first week in the United States. The album also debuted at number one on twelve other national album charts, such as the United Kingdom Official Albums Chart and Australian ARIA Albums Chart. Singles from the album also found success; "Run" and "The Sky Is a Neighborhood" both peaked at number one at the Billboard Mainstream Rock Songs chart. An eponymous headlining tour to promote the album ran through the second half of 2017.

Background

The band's earliest ideas for their ninth studio album included creating a studio on the Hollywood Bowl amphitheater in California and recording the album live in front of a crowd of 20,000 people. However, frontman Dave Grohl lost interest in the idea upon learning that it had already recently been done by PJ Harvey with her 2015 recording sessions for her album The Hope Six Demolition Project. Plans further changed due to the events of the band touring in support of their prior studio album, Sonic Highways, when Grohl fell off the stage and broke his leg at a June 2015 concert in Sweden. Through the use of a self-designed "throne", a large chair that could sit him comfortably on stage, Grohl and the band completed the tour and recorded the Saint Cecilia EP and song.

After the tour, in early 2016, the band announced they would enter an indefinite hiatus. While no reasons were given at the time, in 2017, Grohl told Rolling Stone that he was still struggling from the injury, still unable to walk and enduring daily, lengthy physical therapy sessions. He secluded himself from the band, and set a goal for himself to stay away from music for an entire year while he focused on recuperating. However, at six months to the day, he cancelled the plan when he began writing the lyrics to the track "Run".

Writing and recording

Initial writing sessions only involved Grohl, who continued being in seclusion from the band, although he initially struggled, feeling "out of practice" and "creatively atrophied" due to his longer than usual break from music. Grohl rented an Airbnb in Ojai, California, so he could focus on long bouts of writing, with Grohl recounting "I brought a case of wine and sat there in my underwear with a microphone for about five days, just writing." After twelve or thirteen rough ideas were mapped out, he ran them by the band, who shared Grohl's belief that he was on the right track with the material. Happy with his work, but feeling the material still required further development, Grohl started thinking about reaching out to a music producer.

The band ended up working with music producer Greg Kurstin on the album. Grohl had been listening to the work of Kurstin's indie pop band, The Bird and the Bee since 2014 and was very impressed with his work, calling it "so much more sophisticated than anything [he'd] ever heard." Grohl reached out to Kurstin, and learned that he had taken a hiatus from The Bird and the Bee to focus on his work as a music producer, producing songs including Halsey's "Strangers", Sia's "The Greatest" and "Cheap Thrills", and Adele's "Hello". The two both were interested in the challenge presented with working together – Kurstin had never worked on a heavy rock album, while Grohl had never worked with a pop songwriter – and decided to collaborate on the album.

Recording was done at the heavily populated EastWest Studios, where the band frequently ran into, and interacted with, various other musicians in the studio building. Recording sessions frequently culminated in large barbecues and alcohol drinking among the other artists using the studios, often leading to Grohl grilling meat for parties of up to forty people while finishing up recording sessions. The setup led to the band having a number of high-profile collaborations on the album. The band worked with Boyz II Men member Shawn Stockman on the album's title track and album closer, which stemmed from a chance meeting between Grohl and Stockman in the parking lot. Grohl also announced that "probably the biggest pop star in the world" would provide backing vocals on a track as well, though he refused to name who, leading to much speculation due to the number of pop stars Kurstin had previously worked with prior to the Foo Fighters. Grohl later clarified that it was not Adele or Taylor Swift, and that the person has "been around a long time", and eventually revealed it to be Justin Timberlake. Further collaborations include vocals by Inara George on the track "Dirty Water", saxophone by David Koz on the track "La Dee Da", and vocals by Alison Mosshart of The Kills on "La Dee Da" and "The Sky Is a Neighborhood". Additionally, Paul McCartney contributed drums to the track "Sunday Rain" after entering the studio and recording two drum tracks without even hearing the song first, basing his performance entirely on Grohl recreating the song acoustically for him on the spot. Concrete and Gold also marks Rami Jaffee's first credit as an official band member, having been a session and touring keyboardist for the band since 2005.

While not a formal collaborator on the album, Grohl also would travel to visit past collaborator Josh Homme of Queens of the Stone Age during the recording sessions as well, who was working in the nearby United Recording music studio. The two often played in-progress material for each other, as each was working on a new approach of recording a rock album with a pop music producer, Homme doing the same thing with music producer Mark Ronson on the album Villains.

Composition and themes
The band describe the album's sound as where "hard rock extremes and pop sensibilities collide", comparing it conceptually to being "Motorhead's version of Sgt. Pepper" or "Slayer making Pet Sounds". Explaining further, the album's sound was described as combining heavy guitar riffs with "lush harmonic complexities". Hawkins added that in contrast to their mindset in the previous albums going to "let's make a good rock n' roll record", Concrete and Gold was "the weird record." Grohl described the title track, which features the vocals of Shawn Stockman from Boyz II Men, as sounding like "Black Sabbath and Pink Floyd" and explaining that they "built a choir" out of Stockman's vocal takes, overdubbing them so it sounds "like 40 vocals stacked". Hawkins described the album as their "most psychedelic" and "weirdest" sounding. Writers described the album's overall sound as hard rock and progressive rock.

Lyrically, the album is based around Grohl's thoughts about the future of the United States – "politically, personally, as a father, an American and a musician". While the lyrics were written to vent Grohl's political frustrations, the album lyrics themselves are not overtly-political. Grohl also stated an overall theme of the album was “hope and desperation”. "The Sky Is a Neighborhood" and "T-Shirt" represent a more bleak worldview by Grohl's, the two songs showing his concern for the future of humanity, and desire for escapism, respectively. The election and presidency of Donald Trump was cited as a huge influence of Grohl's negativity, with Grohl stating:

Release and promotion

The album was released on September 15, 2017. Two singles were released prior to the album's release, "Run", which topped the  US Billboard Mainstream Rock Songs chart in July 2017, and "The Sky Is a Neighborhood", which is at number 13 on the chart. A third song, "The Line", was also released a week prior to the album, and tracks such as "La Dee Da" had been debuted at live shows earlier in 2017. The band commenced a headlining North American tour in support of the album starting in October 2017. Prior to the tour, the band also plans on throwing their own festival – "Cal Jam 17" – with performances from themselves, Queens of the Stone Age, Cage the Elephant, and a number of other bands, as a large-scale version of an album-release party. Promotions will continue into 2018, including a joint touring with Weezer through Australia and New Zealand in January and February. On October 20, 2017, the band released a previously unreleased b-side song from the album sessions, "Soldier", for the Planned Parenthood benefit compilation album 7-Inches for Planned Parenthood. The third single from the album, "The Line" was released on May 1, 2018.

Reception

Critical response
Concrete and Gold received generally positive reviews from critics. At Metacritic, which assigns a normalized rating out of 100 to reviews from mainstream critics, the album has an average score of 72 out of 100, which indicates "generally favorable reviews" based on 29 reviews.

In his review for AllMusic, editor Stephen Thomas Erlewine concluded that "Foo Fighters show that they're in love with light and shade, fury and quiet, every twist and turn they can make with their instruments, and even if Concrete and Gold isn't about much more than that, it's refreshing to hear the Foos embrace to the logical flashing conclusion of Grohl's allegiance to real rock values." Writing for Classic Rock magazine, Mark Beaumont praised the album for being the "most cohesive consume-in-one-sitting Foo Fighters album in a decade" and concluded that "Grohl does emerge from the modern age with some glimmer of optimism and defiance... If Dave Grohl is an enduring icon of rocking through the hard times, we need him – and Concrete And Gold – now more than ever."

Newsday critic Glenn Gamboa praised Kurstin's production on the album, and the band as well for successfully expressing grander and more artistic statements than past albums. Jon Pareles of The New York Times praised the band's ability to make something new out of all of their influences, concluding that "Mr. Grohl and Foo Fighters wear their influences so openly — Pink Floyd in 'Concrete and Gold', Led Zeppelin in 'Make It Right', the Beatles all over the album — that they still come across as earnest, proficient journeymen, disciples rather than trailblazers. But in 2017, there aren’t even many disciples left, while Foo Fighters keep honing their skills."

In a more reserved review for The Guardian, Alexis Petridis wrote, "Concrete and Gold sees the Foo Fighters gently and enjoyably nudge at the boundaries of what they do, rather than crashing through them to new territory. It’s an album that won’t frighten the horses, but provides enough fresh interest to keep the band ticking over: for the Foo Fighters, you suspect, that means mission accomplished." Emma Swann gave the album a three-out-of-five star rating in her review for DIY, calling it "more interesting than one might’ve expected."

Commercial performance
The album debuted at number one on the Billboard 200 all-format album chart with 127,000 album-equivalent units, of which 120,000 were digital and physical album sales. It is Foo Fighters' second US number-one album, after Wasting Light. Concrete and Gold also became the Foo Fighters' fourth number-one album in the United Kingdom's Official Albums Chart, with 61,000 album-equivalent units, and their seventh in Australia's ARIA Charts, where it soon got certified gold for 35,000 units.

Accolades

Track listing

Personnel
Credits adapted from album's liner notes.

Foo Fighters
 Dave Grohl – lead vocals (tracks 1–8, 10, 11), guitar (1–7, 9–11), acoustic guitar (8), percussion (2, 8)
 Chris Shiflett – guitar (all tracks), percussion (2, 8)
 Pat Smear – guitar (all tracks), percussion (2, 8)
 Nate Mendel – bass (all tracks), percussion (2, 8)
 Taylor Hawkins – drums (tracks 1–8, 10, 11), percussion (2, 6, 8), lead vocals (9), background vocals (1, 3, 4, 7, 10)
 Rami Jaffee – piano (tracks 1, 5, 10), synthesizer (1, 6, 9), Mellotron (2, 7, 10, 11), Casio SK-1 (2), organ (2, 9), percussion (2, 8), Farfisa organ (3, 7), ARP String Ensemble (3), clavinet (5), Reface (5), Wurlitzer (6, 9), vibraphone (7), harmonium and pump organ (8), B3 organ (10), Moog (11)

Guest musicians
 Greg Kurstin – piano (tracks 2, 7), synthesizer (6, 9), vibraphone (7, 10), ARP String Ensemble (7), bass synth (10)
 Taylor Greenwood – background vocals (track 1)
 Justin Timberlake – background vocals (track 3)
 Alison Mosshart – background vocals (tracks 4, 5)
 Kinga Bacik – cello (track 4)
 Thomas Lea – viola (track 4)
 Ginny Luke – violin (track 4)
 Dave Koz – saxophone (track 5)
 Inara George – background vocals (track 6)
 Jessy Greene – violin (tracks 8, 10), cello (11)
 Greg Sierpowski – Optigan (track 8)
 Paul McCartney – drums (track 9)
 Shawn Stockman – background vocals (track 11)

Production
 Greg Kurstin – production
 Foo Fighters — production
 Darrell Thorp — mixing, engineering, mastering
 Alex Pasco — engineering
 Julian Burg — engineering
 Samon Rajabnik — engineering
 Brendan Dekora — engineering
 Chaz Sexton — assistant engineer
 David Ives — mastering

Charts

Weekly charts

Year-end charts

Certifications

References

External links

 

2017 albums
Albums produced by Greg Kurstin
Albums recorded at EastWest Studios
Foo Fighters albums
Political music albums by American artists
RCA Records albums
Progressive rock albums by American artists